WMDC (98.7 FM) is a radio station  broadcasting a classic hits format, licensed to Mayville, Wisconsin, United States.  The station is currently owned by Radio Plus, Inc.

History

The station was originally assigned the call letters WWRS in 1986 and assigned to the frequency of AM 990, and later changed to WMVW on October 31, 1989.  On March 3, 1990, the station changed its call sign to WMVM, and on August 10, 1998, to the current WMDC.

References

External links

MDC
Classic hits radio stations in the United States